Vaux-Chavanne is a village of Wallonia and a district of the municipality of Manhay, located in the province of Luxembourg, Belgium.

The town centre of Manhay is located in Vaux-Chavanne.

During the Middle Ages, the village was owned by the lords of Durbuy. The village church dates from 1865 and is in a Gothic revival style.

References

External links

Former municipalities of Luxembourg (Belgium)